Tamás Szalai (born 1 October 1980 in Székesfehérvár) is a Hungarian midfielder who currently plays for the reserve team of Videoton FC. He plays on the right side of the midfield.

Managerial career
He was appointed as the interim manager of Fehérvár FC.

References

External links 
 Player info
 HLSZ 

1980 births
Living people
Sportspeople from Székesfehérvár
Hungarian footballers
Association football midfielders
Fehérvár FC players
FC Felcsút players
Pécsi MFC players
Zalaegerszegi TE players
Dunaújváros PASE players
Nemzeti Bajnokság I players
Fehérvár FC managers
Hungarian football managers
Nemzeti Bajnokság I managers